The 2013–14 Kansas State Wildcats men's basketball team represented Kansas State University in the 2013–14 NCAA Division I men's basketball season. The head coach was Bruce Weber, who was in his second year at the helm of the Wildcats.  The team played its home games in Bramlage Coliseum in Manhattan, Kansas, its home court since 1988.  Kansas State was a member of the Big 12 Conference. They finished the season 20–13, 10–8 in Big 12 play to finish in fifth place. They lost in the quarterfinals of the Big 12 tournament to Iowa State. They received an at-large bid to the NCAA tournament where they lost in the second round to Kentucky.

Preseason
The team plays its home games at Bramlage Coliseum, which has a capacity of 12,528. They are in their 18th season as a member of the Big 12 Conference. Last season they finished with a record of 27-8 overall, 14-4 in Big 12 play and were Co-Champs of the Big 12 Conference with Kansas but lost in the Big 12 championship game against in-state rival Kansas and earn a trip to the 2013 NCAA Division I men's basketball tournament and were upset by La Salle in the round of 64.

Departures

Class of 2013 recruits

Schedule

|-
!colspan=12 style="background:#512888; color:#FFFFFF;"| Exhibition
|-

|-
!colspan=12 style="background:#512888; color:#FFFFFF;"| Non-conference regular season

|-
!colspan=12 style="background:#512888; color:#FFFFFF;"| Big 12 regular season

|-
!colspan=12 style="background:#512888; color:#FFFFFF;"| Big 12 tournament

|-
!colspan=12 style="background:#512888; color:#FFFFFF;"| NCAA tournament

Rankings

Roster

See also
 2013-14 NCAA Division I men's basketball season
 2013–14 NCAA Division I men's basketball rankings

References

Kansas State Wildcats men's basketball seasons
Kansas State
Kansas State
Wild
Wild